Thunia is a genus of orchids (family Orchidaceae). It is now included in the subtribe Coelogyninae, but was previously treated as the only genus of the subtribe Thuniinae. The genus comprises 6 species, native to Southeast Asia. It is abbreviated Thu in trade journals.

References

External links

The Genus Thunia" by Mr. F. A. Marais February 2001

Arethuseae genera
Coelogyninae